Belayet Hossain (died November 14, 1971) was a heroic Freedom Fighter of the Bangladesh Liberation War. For his bravery in the war of independence, the government of Bangladesh awarded him the title of Bir Uttam.

Birth and education 
The house of martyr Belayet Hossain is in Gachua village of Sandwip Upazila of Chittagong District. His father's name is Majed Mia and mother's name is Bibi Mariam. His wife's name is Tafsila Begum. He has one son and one daughter.

Belayet Hossain served in the 4th East Bengal Regiment of the Pakistan Army. In 1971, this regiment was stationed in Comilla Cantonment. He was in Brahmanbaria from the beginning of March. When the liberation war started, he played an important role in revolting and joining the war. At the end of the resistance war, he fought in the Salda river sub-sector of Sector 2.

Role in the liberation war 
On 14 November 1971, it occupied most of the area of Salda River in Kasba Upazila of Brahmanbaria District. The freedom fighters of Salda River sub-sector of Sector 2 divided into several groups and attacked the defensive position of the Pakistan Army earlier on the night of November 12. November 14 at one o'clock, A strong contingent of Pakistani troops marched through the godown area west of Monowara village to retake the Salda River. Belayet Hossain with his team attacked the advancing Pakistani army. The Pakistani army was devastated by the fierce attack and after a while they start fleeing. Then Belayet Hossain chased them with his comrades while he was leader some of the fraction war. With his extraordinary heroism, the Pakistani army started fleeing. The frightened soldiers then began to retreat, firing back. But he was not a man to give up. His wish was to capture one or two enemy soldiers alive. He continued to move forward with courage and quickness but his wish couldn't get fulfilled. A bullet fired by the enemy came at his head. He fell to the ground and died in battle.

Tomb 
With the help of the villagers, Belayet was buried along with other martyred freedom fighters on a hill in Kullapathar village. This cemetery is now known as Kullapathar Shaheed Memorial.

Awards and honors

Bir Uttom

Gallery

Footnotes

References 

Recipients of the Bir Uttom
1971 deaths
People killed in the Bangladesh Liberation War
People from Sandwip Upazila
Mukti Bahini personnel